Devin Terran Williams (born September 21, 1994) is an American professional baseball pitcher for the Milwaukee Brewers of Major League Baseball (MLB). He made his MLB debut in 2019 and was named the National League's rookie of the year and relief pitcher of the year in 2020.

Career

Early career
Williams attended Christian Brothers College High School until his sophomore year when he transferred to Hazelwood West High School in Hazelwood, Missouri. The Milwaukee Brewers selected him in the second round, with the 54th overall selection, of the 2013 MLB draft. He signed with the Brewers for a $1.35 million signing bonus rather than enroll at the University of Missouri.

During spring training in 2017, Williams tore the ulnar collateral ligament of the elbow. He underwent Tommy John surgery and missed the entire season. In 2019, he was chosen to represent the Brewers at the All-Star Futures Game.

Milwaukee Brewers
On August 5, 2019, the Brewers selected Williams' contract and promoted him to the major leagues. He made his debut on August 7 against the Pittsburgh Pirates at PNC Park. In 13 appearances with the 2019 Brewers, Williams pitched to a 3.95 earned run average (ERA) while striking out 14 batters in  innings pitched.

Williams was named the NL Reliever of the Month for September 2020. In 13 innings he surrendered just four hits, no runs and recorded 24 strikeouts. On October 5, 2020, Williams was named MLB Reliever of the Year, capturing 12 of 17 votes. Williams had a breakout year finishing with an ERA of 0.33, surrendering just 18 hits in 27 innings and 53 strikeouts. He struck out over half the batters he faced in 22 appearances. On November 9, 2020, Williams was named the NL Rookie of the Year, becoming the first relief pitcher to win the award since Craig Kimbrel in 2011. His 0.33 ERA was the lowest in a single season with at least 21 innings pitched since earned runs became an official statistic in 1913.

Williams returned to the Brewers' bullpen for the 2021 season. After allowing only a single earned run in 14 relief appearances during August, he was named NL Reliever of the Month for the second time. On September 29, 2021, it was announced that Williams would miss the remainder of the season after fracturing his pitching hand after drinking alcohol and punching a wall following the celebrations following the team's NL Central Division title clinch the Sunday before.

In October 2022, it was announced that Williams intended to represent Team USA in the 2023 World Baseball Classic.

On January 13, 2023, Williams agreed to a one-year, $3.35 million contract with the Brewers, avoiding salary arbitration.

Pitching style 
Williams has two primary pitches: 4-seam fastball and a circle changeup with screwball-like movement while rotating the ball off the ring finger during release, which is also similar to a cricket leg-spinner bowling a googly, but at a much faster pace of around 85 mph and with a very high spin-rate of 2852 rpm. He also has a rarely-used cutter and sinker. In 2020, due to the increased movement on the changeup, he increased its usage and often used it as a strikeout pitch. He refers to his changeup as the "Airbender," a nickname coined by Rob Friedman.

References

External links

1994 births
Living people
People from Florissant, Missouri
Baseball players from Missouri
Major League Baseball pitchers
Major League Baseball Rookie of the Year Award winners
Milwaukee Brewers players
National League All-Stars
Arizona League Brewers players
Helena Brewers players
Wisconsin Timber Rattlers players
Brevard County Manatees players
Carolina Mudcats players
Biloxi Shuckers players
San Antonio Missions players
African-American baseball players
2023 World Baseball Classic players